Neil Munro is the name of:

 Neil Munro (actor) (1947–2009), Scottish-born Canadian director, actor and playwright
 Neil Munro (journalist), political journalist
 Neil Munro (skier) (born 1967), British Olympic skier
 Neil Munro (writer) (1863–1930), Scottish journalist, newspaper editor, author and literary critic
 Neil Gordon Munro (1863–1942), Scottish physician and anthropologist, resident in Japan for almost fifty years
 Neil Munro (footballer) (1868–1948), Scottish footballer who played for Abercorn and Scotland

See also
 John Neil Munro, author of The Sensational Alex Harvey and Some People Are Crazy — The John Martyn Story
 Neil Munro Roger, see Bunny Roger